Coop, COOP, Co-op, or variation, most often refers to:

 A chicken coop or other enclosure
 Cooperative  or co-operative ("co-op"), an association of persons who cooperate for their mutual social, economic, and cultural benefit
 Housing cooperative, e.g., a co-op apartment in a co-op apartment building
 Building cooperative
 Food cooperative or "food co-op"
 Consumer cooperative
 Worker cooperative
 Prison, in slang
 Cooperative video game, "co-op mode" in video games
 Co-operative board game

Coop, COOP or Co-op may also refer to:

Arts and entertainment
 Coop! The Music of Bob Cooper, a 1959 album
 The Co-op, a 1980s singer-songwriter cooperative that formed the Fast Folk musical magazine

Fictional characters 
 Coop (Charmed), a fictional character from the television series Charmed and its franchise.
 Cooper Bradshaw, in the soap opera Guiding Light, nicknamed "Coop"
 Marissa Cooper, in the television series The O.C., nicknamed "Coop"
 Coop, in the animated television series Megas XLR
 Coop Burtonburger, in the animated television series Kid vs. Kat
 The titular character of the film J. W. Coop, played by Cliff Robertson
 Dale Cooper, in the television series Twin Peaks, nicknamed "Coop"

Businesses

Supermarket chains 

 Co-op Atlantic, a chain of member-owned grocery stores in Canada
 Coop amba, Denmark
 Coop Eesti Keskühistu, a supermarket chain in Estonia
 Coop (Hungary)
 Coop (Italy)
 Coop (Netherlands)
 Coop Norge, Norway
 COOP (Puerto Rico)
 Coop Jednota, a supermarket chain in Slovakia and in the Czech Republic
 Coop Forum, Sweden
 Coop (Switzerland)
 Co-op Food, United Kingdom

Other businesses
 The Co-op Bookshop, an Australian bookstore chain
 The Co-operative brand, used by several UK co-operative businesses
 The Co-operative Group, the largest co-operative in the UK
 CO-OP Financial Services, an interbank ATM network operating in Canada and United States
 Federated Co-operatives, a Canadian co-operative federation known for its "CO-OP" brand products and stores
 Harvard/MIT Cooperative Society, nicknamed "The Coop", a cooperative campus store based in Cambridge, Massachusetts, United States

People 
 Coop (surname), a list of people
 Coop (artist), American hot-rod artist Chris Cooper (born 1968)
 Davie Cooper, nicknamed “Coop”, Scottish international footballer (1956–1995)

Politics and government 
 Coop-NATCCO, a political party in the Philippines
 Continuity of Operations Plan, a United States continuity of government initiative
 Craft of Opportunity Program, a Royal Australian Navy minesweeper acquisition program

Other uses 
 .coop, a sponsored top-level domain (sTLD) in the Domain Name System of the internet
 COOP exam, a standardized admission test at certain U.S.-based Catholic high schools
 Cooperative education, a structured method of combining classroom-based education with practical work experience
 Cooperative Observer (COOP), a network of American volunteer weather observers
 Allerton Coops, historic apartment building complex in the Bronx, New York

See also 

 
 
 
 Coupé
 Coops, a surname
 Coopes, a surname
 Coope, a surname
 Cooper (surname)
 Koop (disambiguation)
 Co-operative Party (disambiguation)
 Cooperative (disambiguation)